Main Aur Mera Haathi is a 1981 Hindi-language Indian film directed by R. Thiagaraj, starring Mithun Chakraborty, Poonam Dhillon, Suresh Oberoi and Sharat Saxena.

Cast
Mithun Chakraborty as Ram / Raj (Double Role)
Poonam Dhillon as Meena / Julie
Suresh Oberoi as Teja (Bandit)
Sharat Saxena as Vicky (Bandit)
Mahendra Sandhu as Rakesh / Raka (Bandit) 
Satyen Kappu as Kumar, Ram's Father
Ram Sethi as Professor
Keshto Mukherjee
Madhu Malhotra as Miss Lily
Seema Deo
Pandari Bai

Soundtrack
All songs are written by Maya Govind.

External links
 

1981 films
1980s Hindi-language films
Films scored by Kalyanji Anandji
Films about elephants
Films directed by R. Thyagarajan (director)
Elephants in India